Bergen Port Authority is an intermunicipal enterprise owned by the municipalities of Askøy, Austrheim, Bergen, Fedje, Fjell, Lindås, Meland, Os, Radøy, Sund and Øygarden as well as Hordaland county municipality. The port authority operates all seaports in the designated area, including Bergen Port and the oil refinery Mongstad. There are also bunkering terminals, a dry dock and floating docks within the jurisdiction of the authority.

Port authorities of Norway
Transport companies of Vestland
Companies based in Bergen
Water transport in Vestland
Lindås
Fjell
Askøy
Intermunicipal companies of Norway